Akeed Mofeed (事事為王; foaled 14 February 2009) is a Thoroughbred racehorse trained in Ireland by John Oxx and arrived in Hong Kong in 2012. In Hong Kong he was trained by Richard Gibson. He is notable for winning the BMW Hong Kong Derby 2013 and the Longines Hong Kong Cup 2013.

Born on 14 February 2009 in England, Akeed Mofeed is sired by Dubawi, a three-time Group 1 winner whose renowned offspring include Dubai World Cup winner Monterosso and Cathay Pacific Hong Kong Sprint winner Lucky Nine. Before arriving in Hong Kong, Akeed Mofeed finished 4th in the Irish Derby 2012 and thereafter won a listed race, the Platinum Stakes. With great expectations from the media, Akeed Mofeed opened its account by winning an 1800m Class 2 race in early March 2013 and subsequently sealed its status as the best local 4-year-old of the year by capturing victory in the BMW Hong Kong Derby 2013. Akeed Mofeed is also the 1st runner-up of the G2 LONGINES Jockey Club Cup (2000m) at Sha Tin racecourse on Sunday, 17 November, losing only by a diminishing head to Endowing, the champion. On 8 December 2013, Akeed Mofeed was crowned champion of G1 LONGINES Hong Kong Cup.

Dubai World Cup
Akeed Mofeed was invited to represent Hong Kong in the Dubai World Cup Carnival and compete in the most prestigious race, G1 Dubai World Cup (2000M – “Tapeta”) on 29 March 2014. He finished fifth among sixteen runners and won a prize of US$300,000.

Stallion career
Akeed Mofeed retired from racing on 6 June 2014 and stands as a stallion at owner Pan Sutong's Goldin Farms, Lindsay Park in South Australia.

Form Records

References

External links
Hong Kong Jockey Club

2009 racehorse births
Racehorses bred in the United Kingdom
Racehorses trained in Ireland
Racehorses trained in Hong Kong
Thoroughbred family 13-b